GardenSMART is a home and garden television series hosted by Eric Johnson and airing on the public television stations. The series debuted in 2001. Even though the show deals heavily with gardening, it is also a show about horticulture and outdoor design as well.

References

External links

2001 American television series debuts
2000s American reality television series
2010s American reality television series
PBS original programming
2020s American reality television series